The Burmese ferret-badger (Melogale personata), also known as the large-toothed ferret-badger, is a mustelid native to Southeast Asia.

Description
The fur ranges from fawn brown to dark brown, with a white dorsal stripe. The face is marked with black and white patches, which are unique to each individual. The rear part of the tail is whitish.

Subspecies
Three subspecies are recognized:
 M. p. personata, northeastern India and Bangladesh to southern Burma and Thailand
 M. p. nipalensis, Nepal
 M. p. pierrei, Cambodia, southern China, Laos and Viet Nam.

References

External links

 Photo of Burmese ferret-badger

 

Burmese ferret-badger
Mammals of India
Mammals of Southeast Asia
Burmese ferret-badger